Queen Soheon (소헌왕후 심씨, 12 October 1395 – 19 April 1446), of the Cheongsong Sim clan, was a posthumous name bestowed to the wife and queen consort of Yi Do, King Sejong and the mother of Yi Hyang, King Munjong and Yi Yu, King Sejo. She was queen consort of Joseon and honoured as Queen Gong (공비) from 1418 until her death in 1446.

Biography

Early life 
Lady Sim was born as the first daughter and eldest child of nine children to Lord Sim On and Lady Ahn of the Sunheung Ahn clan. Her paternal uncle, Sim Jong, was King Taejo's son-in-law (titled Prince Consort Cheongwon) through his marriage to the king's daughter, Princess Gyeongseon.

Marriage 
In 1408 at the age of 13, she was arranged to marry King Taejong's son, Prince Chungyeong, to which her title became Princess Gyeongsuk (경숙옹주, 敬淑翁主). It's said that she was chosen for the marriage due to the fact that King Taejong's older sister, Princess Gyeongseon, was her paternal aunt; thus having royal family connections. 

When her husband became grand prince, her title changed from ongju (옹주) to gongju (공주). 

Her parents were given royal titles: her mother was given "Internal Princess Consort Samhanguk of the Sunheung Ahn clan" (삼한국대부인 순흥 안씨), and her father was given "Internal Prince Cheongcheon" (청천부원군).

During Taejong's 17th year of reign in 1417, Princess Gyeongsuk was also given the title of Internal Princess Consort Samhanguk (삼한국대부인, 三韓國大夫人).

On 6 July 1418, during the 18th year of Taejong's reign, Princess Gyeongsuk became Crown Princess Gyeong (경빈, 敬嬪) when Grand Prince Chungyeong (later King Sejong) became the crown prince successor to the throne, and when her husband became king on 9 September 1418, her title changed to Queen Gong (공비, 恭妃; Gongbi meaning Courteous Consort). 

It's said that Queen Gong had a gentle and kind appearance but advocated strict adherence to laws and code of conduct.

Royal political conflicts 
Just like her predecessor and mother-in-law, Queen Dowager Hudeok, Queen Gong experienced the loss of her family as Taejong felt threatened due to the influence of royal in-law's. She had lost her father, Sim On, in 1419 and two uncles in 1418 during her father-in-law's regency with her husband. Her mother and remaining relatives were also demoted to lower slave class.

But in 1426, rather than having his in-law’s serve as slaves, Sejong expelled the Queen’s mother and relatives from Cheonan, and restored the posts of her brothers and male relatives.

Court officials brought up the topic of demoting or stripping Queen Gong's position as Queen, but King Sejong fought back. He stated that the Queen was to remain in her position due to giving birth to two princes prior to the conflict. 

Rather than holding resentment towards to her husband, Queen Gong was understanding and supportive of her husband through the ordeal. 

As a Queen with duties, it's said that the inner court was at its most peaceful during her care. King Sejong also praised her for being a good leader for the women of the palace.

Later life 

On 14 April 1446, Queen Gong died at the age of 50 during her husband's 28th year of reign. King Sejong outlived her by 2 years and eventually died at the age of 52.

Queen Gong bore 10 children which included King Munjong and King Sejo.

Legacy
Queen Soheon was buried with her husband, King Sejong in a burial mound, surrounded by statues of scholars, military officials, and horses. The site has a memorial shrine and pond. Their tomb, Yeongneung, is within the Royal Tombs of the Joseon Dynasty, west of the city of Yeoju.

Prince Suyang commissioned the creation of the Seokbosangjeol after the death of his mother, Queen Soheon, intending it to ease her passage to the next life. It was, however, also made available to the general population of Korea, to encourage the propagation of the Buddhist faith. It was translated from Chinese to Korea's native hangul characters, and as such represents the oldest form of indigenous Korean written text. The book was written at his father's request, and included more than 580 Buddhist lyrics by Sejong in Wolincheongangligok. It was first published in 24 volumes in 1447 C.E. An original edition is held at the National Library of Korea in Seoul, where it is designated a Tangible Cultural Treasure.

Trivia 
Through her younger brothers, Queen Soheon eventually became the 3rd great-grandaunt to Queen Insun; the wife of King Myeongjong, and Sim Ui-gyeom; the younger brother of Queen Insun. The Queen also became the 9th great-grandaunt to Queen Danui; the wife of King Gyeongjong.

Family
Parent
 Half-Uncle – Sim In-bong (심인봉, 沈仁鳳)
 Aunt - Princess Consort Dongyang of the Pyeongsan Shin clan (동양군부인 평산 신씨, 東陽郡夫人 平山 申氏)
 Half-cousin - Sim Ho (심호, 沈灝)
 Half-cousin - Lady Sim of the Cheongsong Sim clan (청송 심씨)
 Half-cousin - Lady Sim of the Cheongsong Sim clan (청송 심씨)
 Half-Uncle – Sim Ui-gwi (심의귀, 沈義龜) or Sim Ui-gu (심의구)
 Aunt - Lady Kim of the Sangju Kim clan (상주 김씨)
 Half-cousin - Sim Gu (심구, 沈溝)
 Half-cousin - Lady Sim of the Cheongsong Sim clan (청송 심씨)
 Half-Uncle – Sim Do-saeng (심도생, 沈道生) or Sim Gye-nyeon (심계년)
 Aunt - Lady Choi of the Kangjin Choi clan (강진 최씨)
 Half-cousin - Sim Yeon (심연, 沈涓)
 Half-cousin - Sim Gi (심기, 沈沂)
 Half-Uncle – Sim Jing (심징, 沈澄) (? - 17 April 1432)
 Aunt - Lady Song of the Yeosan Song clan (정부인 여산 송씨)
 Half-cousin - Sim Seok-jun (심석준, 沈石雋)
 Half-first cousin - Sim Seon (심선, 沈璿)(? - 20 September 1467)
 Half-first cousin twice - Sim Ahn-in (심안인)
 Half-first cousin twice - Lady Sim of the Cheongsong Sim clan (청송 심씨)
 Half-first cousin twice-in-law - Yi Ye, Prince Yeongwon (영원군 예, 寧原君 澧)
 Half-first cousin twice - Sim Ahn-ui (심안의, 沈安義) (1438 - 17 March 1476)
 Half-first cousin twice-in-law - Princess Jeongan (정안옹주) (1441 - 1461)
 Father − Sim On (심온, 沈溫) (1375 – 18 January 1419)
 a) Grandfather − Sim Deok-Bu (1328 – 1401) (심덕부, 沈德符)
 b) Great-Grandfather − Sim Ryong (심룡, 沈龍)
 c) Great-Great-Grandfather − Sim Yeon (심연, 沈淵)
 b) Great-Grandmother − Lady Kim (김씨, 金氏)
 a) Grandmother − Lady Mun of the Incheon Mun clan (인천 문씨, 仁川 門氏); Sim Deok-bu's second wife
 a) Step-grandmother - Internal Princess Consort Byeonhanguk of the Cheongju Song clan (변한국대부인 청주 송씨, 卞韓國大夫人 淸州 宋氏)
 Uncle – Sim Jong (심종, 沈悰) (? - 15 March 1418)
 Aunt - Princess Gyeongseon (경선공주)
 Cousin - Lady Sim of the Cheongsong Sim clan (청송 심씨)
 Cousin-in-law - Yi Myeong-shin (이명신, 李明晨) of the Deoksu Yi clan (덕수 이씨, 德水 李氏) (1392 - 1459)
 First cousin - Yi Chu (이추, 李抽) (1417 -?)
 Uncle – Sim Jeong (심정, 沈泟) (? - 1418)
 Aunt - Lady Wang of the Kaeseong Wang clan (개성 왕씨, 開城 王氏)
 Cousin - Sim Gyeon (심견,?沈堅)
 Half-cousin - Sim Mal-dong (심말동, 沈末同) (? - 1493)
 Half Cousin-in-law - Lady Yi of the Seongju Yi clan (성주 이씨, 聖州 李氏)
 Half first cousin - Sim Gye-son (심계손, 沈繼孫)
 Half first cousin - Royal Consort Suk-yong of the Cheongsong Sim clan (숙용 심씨) (1465 - 1515)
 Cousin - Sim Dong (심동, 沈童)
 Mother − Internal Princess Consort Samhanguk of the Sunheung Ahn clan (? – 1444) (삼한국대부인 순흥 안씨, 三韓國大夫人 順興 安氏) 
 a) Grandfather − Ahn Cheon-Bo (1339 – 1425) (안천보) 
 b) Grandmother − Lady Kim of the Yeongju Kim clan (영주 김씨)

Siblings

 Younger sister − Lady Sim of the Cheongsong Sim clan (청송 심씨) (1397 - ?)
 Brother-in-law - Kang Seok-deok (강석덕, 姜碩德) (1395 - 1459) of the Jinju Kang clan (진주 강씨)
 Nephew - Kang Hui-ahn (강희안, 姜希顔) (1419 - 1464)
 Niece-in-law - Lady Yi of the Goseong Yi clan; daughter of Yi Gok (이곡, 李谷)
 Niece-in-law - Lady Kim; daughter of Kim Jung-haeng (김중행, 金仲行)
 Nephew - Kang Hui-maeng (강희맹, 姜希孟) (1424 - 1483)
 Niece - Royal Noble Consort Yeong of the Jinju Kang clan (영빈 강씨) (? - 1483)
 Nephew-in-law - King Sejong of Joseon (15 May 1397 – 8 April 1450) (세종)
 Niece - Lady Kang of the Jinju Kang clan (진주 강씨)
 Nephew-in-law - Park Mi (박미, 朴楣) (1433 - 1491) of the Miryang Park clan (밀양 박씨, 密陽 朴氏)
 Younger sister − Lady Sim of the Cheongsong Sim clan (청송 심씨) (1399 - ?)
 Brother-in-law - No Mul-jae (노물재, 盧物栽) (1396 - 1446) of the Gyoha No clan (교하 노씨)
 Nephew - No Hoe-shin (노회신, 盧懷愼)
 Nephew - No Yu-shin (노유신, 盧由愼)
 Nephew - No Sa-shin (노사신, 盧思愼) (1427 - 1498)
 Niece-in-law - Lady Gyeong of the Cheongju Gyeong clan (청주 경씨)
 Grandnephew - No Gong-pil (노공필, 盧公弼) (1445 - ?)
 Grandnephew - No Gong-jeo (노공저, 盧公著) (1449 - ?)
 Grandnephew - No Gong-seok (노공석, 盧公奭) (1451 - ?)
 Grandnephew - no Gong-yu (노공유, 盧公裕) (1458 - ?)
 Grandniece - Lady No of the Gyoha No clan (교하 노씨, 交河 盧氏) (1460 - ?)
 Grandnephew-in-law - Gu Jang-sun (구장손, 具長孫)
 Great-Grandnephew - No Jung (노종, 盧樅)
 Great Grandniece-in-law - Lady Im of the Pungcheon Im clan (풍천 임씨)
 Nephew - No Ho-shin (노호신, 盧好愼)
 Younger sister − Lady Sim of the Cheongsong Sim clan (청송 심씨) (1401 - ?)
 Brother-in-law - Yu Ja-hae (유자해, 柳子偕) of the Jinju Yu clan (진주 유씨)
 Younger brother − Sim Jun (심준, 沈濬) (1405 - 1448)
 Sister-in-law - Lady Min of the Yeoheung Min clan (여흥 민씨) (1403 - ?); Queen Wongyeong's grandniece
 Nephew - Sim Mi (심미)
 Nephew - Sim Chi (심치)
 Niece-in-law - Lady Kim of the Suncheon Kim clan (순천 김씨)
 Younger sister − Lady Sim of the Cheongsong Sim clan (청송 심씨) (1406 - 1466)
 Brother-in-law - Lee Sung-ji (이숭지, 李崇之) (? - 1462) of the Jeonui Lee clan (전의 이씨)
 Half-brother – Sim Jang-su (심장수, 沈長壽) (1408 - ?)
 Half-brother – Sim Jang-gi (심장기, 沈長己) (1409 - ?)
 Younger sister − Lady Sim of the Cheongsong Sim clan (청송 심씨) (1413 - ?)
 Brother-in-law - Park Geo-so (박거소, 朴去疎) of the Suncheon Park clan (순천 박씨) (1413 - ?)
 Nephew - Park Jong-seon (박중선, 朴仲善) (1435 - 1481)
 Nephew - Park Suk-seon (박숙선, 朴叔善)
 Younger brother − Sim Hoe (심회, 沈澮) (1418 - 1493) 
 Sister-in-law - Lady Kim of the Wonju Kim clan (정경부인 원주 김씨, 貞敬夫人 原州 金氏) 
 Nephew - Sim In (심인, 沈麟)
 Nephew - Sim Han (심한, 沈瀚)
 Niece-in-law - Lady Yi of the Seongju Yi clan (정부인 성주 이씨)
 Nephew - Sim Won (심원, 沈湲)
 Niece-in-law - Lady Yi of the Jeonju Yi clan (증 정경부인 전주 이씨)
 Grandnephew - Sim Sun-do (심순도, 沈順道)
 Grandnephew - Sim Sun-gyeong (심순경, 沈順經) (1462 - 1542)
 Grandnephew - Sim Sun-mun (심순문, 沈順門)
 Grandniece-in-law - Lady Kim of the Gyeongju Kim clan (정경부인 경주 김씨, 貞敬夫人 慶州 金氏)
 Great-Grandnephew - Sim Yeon-won (심연원, 沈連源) (1491 - 1558)
 Younger brother − Sim Gyeol (심결, 沈決) (1419 - 1470)
 Sister-in-law - Lady Shin of the Geochang Shin clan (거창 신씨)
 Nephew – Sim Jeong-won (심정원, 沈貞源)

Husband
 King Sejong of Joseon (15 May 1397 – 8 April 1450) (세종)
 Mother-in-law – Queen Wongyeong of the Yeoheung Min clan (원경왕후 민씨) (29 July 1365 – 18 August 1420)
 Father-in-law – King Taejong of Joseon (조선 태종) (13 June 1367 – 30 May 1422)

Issue
 Daughter – Princess Jeongso (1412 – 25 February 1424) (정소공주)
 Son – Yi Hyang, King Munjong (15 November 1414 – 1 June 1452) (조선 문종). Wives: a) Crown Princess Consort Hwi of the Andong Kim clan (1410–1429) (휘빈 김씨), b) Crown Princess Consort Sun of the Haeum Bong clan (1414–1436) (순빈 봉씨), c) Queen Hyeondeok of the Andong Gwon clan (17 April 1418 – 10 August 1441) (현덕왕후 권씨)
 Daughter – Princess Jeongui (1415 – 11 February 1477) (정의공주). Husband: Ahn Maeng-Dam (1415 – 1462) (안맹담)
 Son – Yi Yu, King Sejo (2 November 1417 – 23 September 1468) (조선 세조). Wife: Queen Jeonghui of the Papyeong Yun clan (8 December 1418 – 6 May 1483) (정희왕후 윤씨)
 Son – Yi Yong, Grand Prince Anpyeong (18 October 1418 – 18 November 1453) (이용 안평대군). Wife: Princess Consort of the Yeongil Jeong clan (? – 31 May 1453) (부부인 영일 정씨)
 Son – Yi Gu, Grand Prince Imyeong (7 January 1420 – 21 January 1469) (이구 임영대군). Wives: a) Princess Consort of the Uiryeong Nam clan (군부인 의령 남씨), b) Princess Consort Jean of the Jeonju Choi clan (제안부부인 최씨), c) Princess Consort of the Andong Ahn clan (부부인 안동 안씨)
 Son – Yi Yeo, Grand Prince Gwangpyeong (2 May 1425 – 7 December 1444) (이여 광평대군). Wife: Princess Consort Yeongga of the Pyeongsan Shin clan (영가부부인 신씨)
 Son – Yi Yu, Grand Prince Geumseong (28 March 1426 – 21 October 1457) (이유 금성대군). Wife: Princess Consort Wansan of the Jeonju Choi clan (완산부부인 최씨)
 Son – Yi Im, Grand Prince Pyeongwon (18 November 1427 – 16 January 1445) (이임 평원대군). Wife: Princess Consort Gangnyeong of the Namyang Hong clan (? – 1483) (강녕부부인 홍씨)
 Son – Yi Yeom, Grand Prince Yeongeung (23 May 1434 – 2 February 1467) (이염 영응대군). Wives: a) Princess Consort Chunseong of the Haeju Jeong clan (춘성부부인 정씨), b) Princess Consort Daebang of the Yeosan Song clan (대방부부인 송씨), c) Princess Consort Yeonseong of the Yeonan Kim clan (연성부부인 김씨)

In popular culture
 Portrayed by Kim Young-ae in the 1983 MBC TV series 500 Years of Joseon: Tree with Deep Roots.
 Portrayed by Im Seo-yeon in the 1996–1998 KBS1 TV series Tears of the Dragon.
 Portrayed by Lee Yoon-ji in the 2008 KBS TV series King Sejong the Great.
 Portrayed by Jang Ji-eun in the 2011 SBS TV series Deep Rooted Tree.
 Portrayed by Jin Ki-joo in the 2015 MBC TV series Splash Splash Love.
 Portrayed by Jeon Mi-seon in the 2019 film The King's Letters.

References

External links
 Soheon, thetalkingcupboard.com

1395 births
1446 deaths
Royal consorts of the Joseon dynasty
Korean queens consort
15th-century Korean women
People from Yangju